The Mozdoksky otdel was a Cossack district (otdel) of the Terek oblast of the Caucasus Viceroyalty of the Russian Empire. The area of the Mozdoksky otdel makes up part of the North Caucasian Federal District of Russia. The district was eponymously named for its administrative center, Mozdok.

Administrative divisions 
The subcounties (uchastoks) of the Mozdoksky otdel were as follows:

Demographics

Kavkazskiy kalendar 

Notes

References

Bibliography 

Otdels of Terek Oblast